Princess Margaret Road (lit. "Princess Road") is a road in Kowloon, Hong Kong, forming a part of Route 1.

Originally called Nairn Road with the English name after a town in Scotland and the Chinese name after the nanmu trees that grew there, the road was renamed to commemorate the 1966 visit to Hong Kong of Princess Margaret, Countess of Snowdon.

Princess Margaret Road starts near at Gascoigne Road, runs northward, cutting through the hills between Quarry Hill, No. 12 Hill and Ho Man Tin proper, and reaches the intersection of Argyle Street and Waterloo Road.

Depicted in the movie The Legend of Speed, it actually is a popular road for illegal street racing.

See also
 List of streets and roads in Hong Kong

References

External links

Google Maps of Princess Margaret Road

Roads in Kowloon
Ho Man Tin
Route 1 (Hong Kong)